Big Ron Manager is a television documentary series based on Ron Atkinson's efforts as a troubleshooter at the English football club Peterborough United, at the time playing in League Two. The series was screened on Sky One in 2006.

Overview
Originally, the show was going to feature Swindon Town and Sky spent around four weeks filming there before being asked to leave by the Swindon management. Peterborough United received a fee of around £100,000 from Sky for access to the changing rooms and for Ron Atkinson to assist the rookie manager Steve Bleasdale.

Bleasdale was the club’s caretaker manager. He had been assistant manager to Mark Wright who had been sacked for allegedly making a racial joke towards one of his players. Bleasdale had only managed once before, at Leigh RMI where the side was relegated from the Conference National. Results were initially good under Bleasdale. At the start of the documentary, Peterborough won four games out of five and were in the play-offs. However, the club quickly suffered a downturn in form and eventually moved into eighth place after several defeats. Over a short space of time, tension began to show between Bleasdale and Atkinson.

There were several instances during the filming of Atkinson upsetting Bleasdale:
Bleasdale accusing Atkinson of having an agenda against him which led to Atkinson calling him “insecure”. As a result, Bleasdale banned him from the dressing room on matchdays. The decision was later overturned.
Although the club were short of funds, Atkinson persuaded the club's Chairman Barry Fry to hire goalkeeping coach Tony Godden.
The pair disagreeing on tactics and style of play.
Suggesting during an injury crisis to sign Queens Park Rangers striker Stefan Moore on loan. Bleasdale instead signed Lloyd Opara on a free transfer from Cheshunt.
Bleasdale admitted his annoyance at Atkinson "criticising" his players in a half-time team talk. Atkinson stated he simply made an observation and spoke with the two players later who were fine with his feedback.

Some scenes highlighted the chaos behind the scenes at the club, including a dressing room brawl between Mark Arber and Paul Carden, and Bleasdale rowing with youngsters Sean St Ledger and Danny Crow. Both Crow and St Ledger protested against extra training and on one occasion, Crow stormed out of the training ground. The show also picked upon the financial struggles at the club.

In one incident, Bleasdale asked St Ledger to leave the training ground following a row. Due to numerous injuries, Bleasdale puts St Ledger back in the side but states that he will play him out of position. With several scouts coming to the game to assess St Ledger, Fry decided to take charge of their important game against Macclesfield Town and start St Ledger in his usual position and offers to face the press should Peterborough lose. This led to Bleasdale walking out only an hour before kick-off. Barry Fry then put himself in charge for the final two games of the season.

Episode overview

Awards
In 2007, the programme won a Royal Television Society (RTS) Programme Award for Best Sports Show. The judges noted that the show was a "hugely entertaining entry into a sporting world that sometimes beggared belief."

Aftermath
Big Ron Manager was regarded as a low point in the fortunes of Peterborough United. However, it proved the catalyst for future revival. Barry Fry stated that "The documentary has created so much interest throughout the world. I have had many people flying in from France, Scotland, Portugal and Spain to come and see me wanting to help this club in sponsorship and investment."  Property businessman Darragh MacAnthony—who previously had no connection with the club—watched the show on television and a few months purchased the club and later became chairman. Under MacAnthony's investment and his appointment of Darren Ferguson as the club's manager in 2007, Peterborough gained promotion to League One in 2008 and then to the Championship in 2009. Fry also stated that MacAnthony buying the club was the "best thing" that personally ever happened to him. Speaking to FourFourTwo magazine, he said: "He saved my life. I couldn't have carried on like that, the worry would've killed me."

Bleasdale struggled to gain work in football due to his reputation gained from the documentary. He later managed part-time sides Leigh Genesis and Bangor City. Bleasdale spoke openly to the media expressing his disappointment in how the documentary was edited and criticised Atkinson, claiming he "didn't learn anything" from him. In 2021, Fry  said of Bleasdale’s decision to resign: "Obviously no manager likes to be told who to play, but as owner of the football club I had to pay the bills. I had to make that decision. He was all right, saying ‘yeah, yeah’, then the next minute we were in the dressing room and he resigned. In the end, we sold Sean for a few hundred thousand. Steve was paranoid about Ron, but he was never a threat."
Bleasdale now works as a wedding photographer. 

Striker Danny Crow claimed that the show hindered his chances of career progression. Speaking to the local media in 2020, Crow said “I was portrayed badly by the programme and I believe that it affected my career. It harmed my chances of progressing.” He stated that he has never watched it but people regularly speak to him about it. He said “Opposition defenders would then say to me oh you’re that so and so from the documentary. They didn’t know me and yet they were having a go at me.”  Crow was seen as a big prospect but he left Peterborough on a free transfer in 2008 and signed for rivals Cambridge United. He also went on to play for Luton Town, Newport County, Lowestoft Town and Sudbury before moving into coaching. 

Sean St Ledger told The Athletic that he was "embarrassed" when he watched the show and felt his attitude was "cringy", but also claimed some parts of the show were staged. St Ledger joked about suing Sky TV after claiming the programme showed him as the team's "bad boy". This was reported in the media and St Ledger later clarified that the statement was a joke. St Ledger was later a part of the Republic of Ireland UEFA Euro 2012 squad.

Then club captain Phil Bolland is now a qualified physio and works for Liverpool. Bolland said in an interview with FourFourTwo that people still spoke to him about the show. He also stated that he felt Bleasdale was "edited unfairly". Bolland spoke critically of Atkinson, saying: "I think it was purely for him – I don't think he had any interest in us or the play-offs. His driver brought him in, his driver took him away and that was it." Bolland also claimed that some parts of the show were staged. In the same piece,  Fry denies that any of the show was staged saying: "On my mother's grave, there were no set-ups whatsoever." Fry also said that he wished he had asked Sky for more money for producing the show.

Fry also defended his decision to agree to the documentary saying "I’m criticised a lot for putting Peterborough in that position. But it kept everybody in a job, paying their mortgage or their rent, so I don’t mind the stick. I nearly got thrown out of the city of Peterborough, but I was doing it for the right reasons – to keep the club afloat."

Lloyd Opara, the striker brought in by Bleasdale instead of Atkinson's suggestion of Stefan Moore, left the club the next season and never played in the Football League again. After quitting football, Opara became a teacher.

References

External links 

Peterborough United F.C.
Sky UK original programming
2000s British documentary television series
2006 British television series debuts
2006 British television series endings
Association football documentary television series